James Francis Donovan III (born July 17, 1956) is an American radio and television personality who serves as sports director and news anchor for WKYC channel 3 (NBC) in Cleveland, Ohio, and has been the radio voice of the Cleveland Browns Radio Network since 1999.

Early life and career beginnings
Donovan was born in Boston, Massachusetts. He is a 1978 graduate of Boston University and began his career as a sports director for WJON radio in St. Cloud, Minnesota. From Minnesota, he moved to Vermont, providing play-by-play basketball and hockey coverage for the Satellite News Channel in Burlington, Vermont. He also did play-by-play and sports anchoring at WVMT radio and WEZF-TV.

He also served for one season as play-by-play announcer for the Vermont Reds, a Cincinnati Reds minor league baseball team (which coincidentally is now the Akron RubberDucks, a Cleveland Guardians minor league team).

WKYC and SportsTime Ohio
Following the death of WKYC weeknight sports anchor Jim Graner in 1976, the Channel 3 sports director job became something of a "revolving door," as at least six replacements (among them Don Schroeder, Tom Ryther, Joe Pelligrino, Jim Mueller and Wayland Boot) came and went over the next decade – this was until Donovan, who had joined the station in 1985 as weekend sports anchor, finally took over in 1986.  He has held the post ever since.

In 2006, channel 3 and SportsTime Ohio - now known as Bally Sports Great Lakes (BSGL) - acquired the local TV rights to the Cleveland Browns.  So in addition to his duties on WKYC, Donovan also hosts several Browns themed programs on BSGL.

Play-by-play
On the national level Donovan had called play-by-play for NBC Sports' NFL coverage from 1987 to 1997.  He also handled swimming and soccer play-by-play in the 1992 and 1996 Summer Olympics for NBC, and World Cup Soccer in 1994.

In 1999, when the Cleveland Browns returned to the NFL, Donovan was named as radio play-by-play voice of the team.

After WKYC acquired the local, over-the-air television rights to the Cleveland Indians, Donovan served as play-by-play announcer from 2006–2008.

Signature calls
Ten...Five...Touchdown Browns! – when a Browns player scores a touchdown with a clear path to the end zone.

Run William Run! - in reference to William Green 64 yard touchdown run during a Cleveland Browns vs. Atlanta Falcons game in 2002.

Is this how it feels? - when the Browns defeated the New York Jets in Week 3 of the 2018 season, their first victory in 635 days.

Chubba Wubba Hubb! - in reference to Nick Chubbs 92 yard touchdown run during an Atlanta Falcons vs Cleveland Browns game in 2018.

Medical leave
On May 25, 2011, during the 11 pm newscast, Donovan announced he had been battling leukemia for the last ten years, and that he would be taking a leave of absence to undergo a (what would be a successful) bone marrow transplant.

On September 11, 2011, Donovan returned to the Browns broadcasting booth in time for their opener against the Cincinnati Bengals.  The next night, he returned to the sports anchor chair at WKYC, as well as his hosting duties on STO.

Donovan met with his bone marrow donor on Thanksgiving night in 2013, when Dallas Gentry from Wise, Virginia, visited the Donovan family.

News anchor
On January 16, 2012, Donovan expanded his duties at WKYC as he became the anchor of channel 3's 7 p.m. newscast.  He continues in his role as sports anchor at 6 and 11  p.m.

Personal life
Donovan, his wife (Cheryl), and daughter (Meghan) live in Hinckley, Ohio.

Awards and honors
Three-time Lower Great Lakes Emmy Award winner.
1988 Cleveland Press Club All-Ohio Best Sportscaster. 
Cleveland Association of Broadcasters Hall of Fame inductee (class of 2005)
Cleveland Press Club Journalism Hall of Fame inductee (class of 2009).
2016 Cleveland Sports Awards Lifetime Achievement Award

References

External links
Cleveland Browns official website

Major League Baseball broadcasters
National Football League announcers
Living people
1956 births
American television reporters and correspondents
Cleveland Browns announcers
Cleveland Indians announcers
Television anchors from Cleveland
Olympic Games broadcasters
American television sports anchors
American soccer commentators
People from Hinckley, Ohio